The 2010 Qatar motorcycle Grand Prix, officially the Commercialbank Grand Prix of Qatar, was the opening round of the 2010 MotoGP championship. It took place on the weekend of 9–11 April 2010 at the Losail International Circuit located in Doha, Qatar. Spectator attendance was 7302. Defending world champion Valentino Rossi won the opening  MotoGP race after Casey Stoner crashed while in the lead, ending his undefeated streak from 2007. This was also the first race for the newly formed Moto2 class, which was introduced as a replacement for the 250cc two-stroke class. All bikes in this class were powered with 600cc four-stroke engines based on the Honda CBR600RR. This event was also known for Shoya Tomizawa's first and only Grand Prix win before he was killed in an accident at the 2010 San Marino motorcycle Grand Prix .

MotoGP classification

Moto2 classification

125 cc classification

Championship standings after the race (MotoGP)
Below are the standings for the top five riders and constructors after round one has concluded.

Riders' Championship standings

Constructors' Championship standings

 Note: Only the top five positions are included for both sets of standings.

References

Qatar motorcycle Grand Prix
Qatar
Motorcycle Grand Prix